Findley Burns Jr. (May 4, 1917 in Baltimore, MD – October 14, 2003 in Southern Pines, NC) was an American Foreign Service officer, Vice Consul, and Ambassador.

A graduate of Princeton University (1939), Burns attended Harvard from 1950–51 and was a student at the National War College in Washington from 1961-62. He was a member of the International Institute for Strategic Studies in London.

Burns entered the Foreign Service in 1941. Some of his early assignments were in Madrid, Brussels, Warsaw, Martinique, and Vienna. He later served as ambassador to Jordan from 1966 to 1968 (where he was stationed during the June 1967 Six-Day War) and as ambassador to Ecuador from 1970 to 1973.

From 1974 to 1980, he worked at the United Nations in New York, where he was director of the office of Technical Cooperation.

References

1917 births
2003 deaths
Princeton University alumni
Harvard University alumni
Ambassadors of the United States to Ecuador
Ambassadors of the United States to Jordan
American expatriates in Spain
American expatriates in Belgium
American expatriates in Poland
American expatriates in France
American expatriates in Austria
United States Foreign Service personnel